is a passenger railway station located in Hodogaya-ku, Yokohama, Japan, operated by the private railway operator Sagami Railway (Sotetsu).

Lines 
Tennōchō Station is served by the Sagami Railway Main Line, and lies 2.4 kilometers from the starting point of the line at Yokohama Station.

Station layout
The station consists of two elevated side platforms with the station building underneath.

Platforms

Adjacent stations

History
Tennōchō Station was opened on September 10, 1930.  The current elevated station building was completed on March 27, 1968.

Passenger statistics
In fiscal 2019, the station was used by an average of 27,312 passengers daily.

The passenger figures for previous years are as shown below.

Surrounding area
 Yokohama Business Park
 Kofukuji Matsubara Shopping Street

See also
 List of railway stations in Japan

References

External links 

 Official home page  

Railway stations in Kanagawa Prefecture
Railway stations in Japan opened in 1930
Railway stations in Yokohama